Boyd Martin (born August 20, 1979) is an American equestrian competing in the discipline of eventing. He has participated in three consecutive Summer Olympic Games (in 2012, 2016, 2020) and is a two-time Pan American Games team gold medalist and individual gold medalist. Boyd and his wife Silva run their Windurra USA training operation out of Cochranville, Pa. He is a two-time CCI5*-L winner, most recently taking top honors aboard On Cue at the 2021 Maryland CCI5*-L, and previously rode True Blue Toozac to the win in the 2003 Adelaide CCI5*-L.

Biography

Olympic three-day event rider Boyd Martin was born to Toy Dorgan, an American speed skater, and Ross Martin, an Australian cross-country skier. His parents met at the 1968 Winter Olympics in Grenoble, France. Martin and his sister Brook were raised in Terrey Hills, New South Wales, on the outskirts of Sydney. Boyd started his riding career in Forrest Hills Pony Club, with a pony named Willy.

The day after he finished high school he moved into the bunkhouse at Heath and Rozzie Ryan's Newcastle Equestrian Centre, and stayed there for the next eight years, first as a working student and later running his own business. Heath Ryan imprinted hard work and horsemanship on Martin and was a huge influence on his early career. During this time Boyd represented Australia at the Young Rider level against New Zealand on a Trans-Tasman three-day event on Brady Bunch, and won the very last long-format four-star event at the 2003 Adelaide CCI4* riding True Blue Toozac. He was long listed for the Australian Eventing Team for the Summer Olympic in 2000, 2004 and 2008.

In 2006 Martin traveled to the U.S. to compete at the Rolex Kentucky CCI4* riding Ying Yang Yo, and fell in love with eventing in the U.S. He then returned to Australia to liquidate most of his assets before he and his wife, Silva (née Stigler), moved to the U.S. in 2007 to pursue their dreams of competing internationally. They both walked away from a very successful business and lifestyle in Australia, starting over from the beginning to build a business in the United States.

For the first three years in the US, Martin worked as an assistant to Phillip Dutton, then in 2010 Silva and Boyd started their own business Windurra USA, LLC.  They leased the upper barn from Dutton, running their business out the same farm. Dutton continued coaching and training Martin through this transition and remains his coach and mentor.

Today, the Martins own their own farm, Windurra USA, in Cochranville, Pennsylvania. Located in Chester County and adjacent to the 3,000-acre Runnymede Sanctuary, the Windurra USA facilities include jumping and dressage arenas, a one-mile gallop track, conditioning pond and round pen, and a newly constructed state-of-the-art indoor arena. The extensive 40+ acre cross-country schooling course at the farm was designed and built by Eric Bull, and includes beginner novice through CCI4* elements. During the winter, Boyd and Silva are based at Stable View Farm in Aiken, South Carolina and Silva also travels to Wellington, Florida to train and compete.

As the son of an American citizen, Martin has always enjoyed dual citizenship, and in 2009 he officially began representing the United States in international competition. He was the top-placed U.S. rider (10th) at the 2010 World Equestrian Games in Lexington, Kentucky riding Neville Bardos; the top U.S. rider (7th place) at the 2014 World Equestrian Games in Normandy, France riding Shamwari 4; and was a member of the U.S. Olympic Eventing Team in London in 2012 riding Otis Barbotiere. In 2015, he placed 4th individually and was a member of the gold-medal winning U.S. team at the Pan American Games in Toronto riding Pancho Villa. The following year, Boyd competed at his second Olympics in Rio de Janeiro, Brazil riding the off-the-track Thoroughbred Blackfoot Mystery. He placed 16th individually and was the second highest placed U.S. athlete, behind Dutton who won the individual bronze medal. In 2019, Boyd helped the U.S. Eventing Team win team gold at the 2019 Lima Pan American Games, where he also secured individual gold aboard Tsetserleg TSF.

As of 2021, he has competed in three Olympic Games (Tokyo 2020, Rio 2016, London 2012), two World Equestrian Games (Tryon 2018, Normandy 2014), two Pan American Games (Lima 2019, Toronto 2015), and has made appearances on numerous Nations Cup teams for the U.S. Throughout his CCI5* career, Boyd is one of the only riders to have competed at every CCI5* competition in the world. In 2021, Martin etched his name into history at the Maryland 5 Star CCI5*-L, taking the first-ever win at the event with On Cue. He also finished 4th aboard On Cue at the 2021 Land Rover Kentucky Three-Day Eventing CCI5*-L presented by MARS Equestrian before finishing inside the top twenty aboard Tsetserleg TSF at the Tokyo 2020 Olympic Games.

Martin's wife, German-born dressage rider, Silva Martin, obtained U.S. citizenship in 2010 and competed on her first U.S. Dressage Team at the Nations Cup in Wellington, Florida in February, 2014 riding Rosa Cha W, helping to bring home a team gold medal. She also operates a separate business under the same banner at Windurra USA and specializes in training dressage horses and coaching a number of high level eventing and dressage riders.

Martin purchased his best-known horse, Neville Bardos, for $850; Neville had been rescued from the racetrack by another trainer who was declared talentless as a jumper. After overcoming tremendous adversity, including a devastating barn fire at True Prospect Farm in 2011, and the deaths of his father and father-in-law shortly after the fire, Martin and Neville made an amazing comeback to finish 7th at the Burghley CCI4* (England), one of the toughest three-day events in the world. Martin finished 2011 ranked 8th on the HSBC World Rankings, Neville Bardos was named the 2011 International Horse of the Year by the USEF, and The Chronicle of the Horse named Martin its 2011 Overall Rider of the Year. They were featured on Rock Center with Brian Williams on NBC Television, the cover page of the New York Times, and were the subject of a Pulitzer Prize winning feature in Sports Illustrated magazine.

Martin has enjoyed much success in international competition, finishing in the top ten at every CCI5* in the world except for Badminton (England), which includes Adelaide CCI5*-L (Australia), Burghley CCI5*-L (England), Kentucky CCI5*-L (USA); Luhmühlen CCI5*-L (Germany); Maryland CCI5*-L (USA); and Pau CCI5*-L (France). He has trained and competed a long list of CCI5* horses including Flying Doctor, Brady Bunch, X-Treme, Starkey, Orchard End Winston, True Blue Toozac, Ying Yang Yo, Neville Bardos, Rock on Rose, Remington XXV, Otis Barbotiere, Trading Aces, Shamwari IV, Crackerjack, Master Frisky, Steady Eddie, Welcome Shadow, Blackfoot Mystery, On Cue, and Tsetserleg TSF.

Martin competes nearly every weekend and coaches a long list of successful riders. He is a sought-after clinician and in the off-season can be found teaching around the United States.

Working hard behind the scenes is a dedicated support team: farriers Doug Neilson and Steve Teichman, and veterinarian Dr. Kevin Keane, DVM, and barn manager and head groom Steph Simpson. He has successfully syndicated multiple upper level event horses and has a devoted group of horse owners involved in his horses' careers.

In addition to training with Phillip Dutton, Martin receives coaching in dressage with his wife, Silva, as well as dressage trainer Scott Hassler, show jumper Peter Wylde, Richard Picken, and he also regularly works with former U.S. Eventing Team Chef d'Equipe Erik Duvander.

His current sponsors include Ariat, Attwood Equestrian Surfaces , Charles Owen, Cowboy Magic, Majyk Equipe Boots, Purina, Smartpak Equine, Lubrisyn HA, Bemer, and Stübben Custom Saddlery. Boyd is an ambassador to the equine welfare charity BrookeUSA.

In 2015 Martin was ranked 3rd in the FEI World Eventing Athlete Rankings and is currently ranked 9th.

Outside of equestrianism, Boyd is a fan of boxing, MMA, and hockey. He has two young sons, Nox and Leo.

CCI5*-L Results

International Championship Results

References

External links
 

American male equestrians
Olympic equestrians of the United States
Equestrians at the 2012 Summer Olympics
Equestrians at the 2016 Summer Olympics
Equestrians at the 2015 Pan American Games
Equestrians at the 2019 Pan American Games
1979 births
Living people
Pan American Games gold medalists for the United States
Pan American Games medalists in equestrian
Sportspeople from Aiken, South Carolina
Medalists at the 2015 Pan American Games
Medalists at the 2019 Pan American Games
Equestrians at the 2020 Summer Olympics